Rich-McCormick Woolen Factory is a historic woolen mill located at Dunnstable Township in Clinton County, Pennsylvania. It was built in 1830, and is a three-story, brick building on a coursed stone foundation and a gable roof.  It measures 32 feet by 50 feet, 6 inches, and four bays by seven bays. It was built as a woolen mill and remained in operation until 1845, after which it was used for storage.  The building was converted to residential use in 1930.

It was listed on the National Register of Historic Places in 1985.

See also
Woolrich

References 

Industrial buildings and structures on the National Register of Historic Places in Pennsylvania
Industrial buildings completed in 1830
Buildings and structures in Clinton County, Pennsylvania
1830 establishments in Pennsylvania
National Register of Historic Places in Clinton County, Pennsylvania